
Coq d'Or (French for Golden Chicken) is a defunct restaurant in Rotterdam in the Netherlands. It was a fine dining restaurant that was awarded one Michelin star in 1957 and retained that rating until 1989.

After a change of course, the restaurant lost its star in 1989. In 1995 the name of the restaurant was changed to "Restaurant Kip" (Dutch for Chicken).

See also
List of Michelin starred restaurants in the Netherlands

Sources and references 

Restaurants in Rotterdam
Michelin Guide starred restaurants in the Netherlands
Defunct restaurants in the Netherlands